= Bagai Khurda =

Village in Uttar Pradesh, India

Bagai Khurda is a village in Prayagraj, Uttar Pradesh, India.
